Mary Glynne (born Mary Aitken; 25 January 1895 – 19 September 1954) was a British actress.

Biography
Glynne was born Mary Aitken in Penarth, Vale of Glamorgan, South Wales. She started her career in 1908, in a stage play called The Dairymaids at the Princes Theatre in Manchester. A month later, she appeared on stage at the Queen's Theatre, London, in the same play. She appeared in numerous stage productions from 1908 to 1954 and in 24 films between 1919 and 1939. Following her appearance in many West End successes, she toured the provinces and, later, South Africa. She was married to Dennis Neilson-Terry,  who died in Rhodesia in 1932. Glynne died in London on 19 September 1954.

Selected filmography

 Unmarried (1920)
 The Call of Youth (1921)
 Appearances (1921)
 The Mystery Road (1921)
 The Princess of New York (1921)
 The White Hen (1921)
 Dangerous Lies (1921)
 The Bonnie Brier Bush (1921)
 The Good Companions (1933)
 Flat Number Three (1934)
 Emil and the Detectives (1935)
 Scrooge (1935)
 Royal Cavalcade (1935)
 Grand Finale (1936)
 The Heirloom Mystery (1936)
 The Angelus (1937)

References

External links

1895 births
1954 deaths
People from Penarth
Welsh film actresses
Welsh stage actresses
Welsh silent film actresses
Terry family